The Brez ( or ) is a traditional belt worn by men throughout Albania, Kosovo, North Macedonia, Serbia, Montenegro and in the Arbëresh villages of Italy.  It originates directly from the Illyrian belt.

See also
Culture of Albania
Vest
Qeleshe
Albanian traditional clothing

References

Albanian clothing
Belts (clothing)
Illyrian Albania